Christophstraße/Mediapark station is an underground Cologne Stadtbahn station in the MediaPark neighborhood, in Cologne, Germany. The station is located on the Cologne Ring.

References

External links 
 
 Station information 

Cologne KVB stations
Innenstadt, Cologne
Cologne-Bonn Stadtbahn stations